The following is a list of massacres that have occurred in Algeria. This is an incomplete list; the total number of massacres reported is far more numerous.  This list does not include massacres that occurred under French colonial rule such as the Caves of Dahra incident in 1845 or the massacre at Setif in 1945 (among many others), nor does it include any of the massacres that took place during the Algerian War of independence.

See also
List of Algerian massacres of the 1990s

References

Algeria
Massacres

Massacres